This is a list of books which have been featured on BBC Radio 4's Book of the Week during 2018.

January
 The Vital Spark: Appointment in Arezzo by Alan Taylor, read by Paul Higgins
 Auntie's War by Edward Stourton, read by the author
 In Search of Mary Shelley by Fiona Sampson, read by Stella Gonet
 Reading Europe: Geert Mak's In Europe by Geert Mak, read by Nicholas Farrell
 No Place to Lay One's Head by Françoise Frenkel, read by Samantha Spiro

February
 Somebody I Used to Know by Wendy Mitchell and Anna Wharton, read by Tessa Gallagher
 Owl Sense by Miriam Darlington, read by Teresea Gallagher
 Yorkshire by Richard Morris, read by Philip Jackson
 The Line Becomes a River by Francisco Cantú, read by Joseph Balderrama

March
 The Wood by John Lewis-Stempel, read by Greg Wise

April
 Factfulness by Hans Rosling, read by Adrian Rawlins
 Packing My Library by Alberto Manguel, read by Oliver Cotton
 Dearest Squirrel by Peter Whitebrook, read by Simon Shepherd and Amanda Root
 Sharp – The Women Who Made an Art of Having an Opinion by Michelle Dean, read by Alexandra Mathie

May
 The Life and Rhymes of Benjamin Zephaniah by Benjamin Zephaniah, read by the author
 The Language of Kindness by Christie Watson, read by Teresa Gallagher
 The Book by Keith Houston, read by Deborah Findlay
 Feel Free by Zadie Smith, read by the author

June
 The Stopping Places by Damian Le Bas, read by the author
 The Wind in My Hair by Masih Alinejad, read by Nathalie Armin
 The Crossway by Guy Stagg, read by Jonathan Bailey

References

Lists of books
Lists of radio series episodes